The flag of Vanuatu was adopted on 18 February 1980.

In 1977 a flag of almost the same colours and symbolism as the future national flag was designed by local artist Kalontas Malon and adopted by the Vanua'aku Pati. When the party led the New Hebrides to independence as Vanuatu in 1980, the colours of the party flag (red, green, black and yellow) were chosen to be the basis for the national flag on Independence Day, 30 July 1980. A parliamentary committee chose the final design based on submissions from local artists.

Symbolism

The green represents the richness of the islands, the red symbolises blood which unites humanity as humans, and the black the ni-Vanuatu people. The Prime Minister of Vanuatu, Father Walter Lini, requested the inclusion of yellow and black fimbriations to make the black stand out. The yellow Y-shape represents the shape of Vanuatu islands on the map and the light of the gospel going through the pattern of the islands in the Pacific Ocean (approximately 83% of the people of Vanuatu profess Christianity).

The emblem in the black is a boar's tusk — the symbol of customs and tradition but also prosperity. Its worn as a pendant on the islands — along with two leaves of the local namele tree. These leaves are supposed to be a token of peace, and their 39 leaflets represent the original 39 members of the Parliament of Vanuatu.

Construction Sheet
The government does not publish a formal specification sheet on its website. The construction sheet shown below is based on measurements from the official 2:3 flag image that appears in the State Flag and Armorial Bearings Public Declaration dated March 18, 1980.

Other flags of Vanuatu

Government flag

Military flags

Political flags

Subnational flags from Vanuatu

Provincial flags

Secessionist Group Flags

City flags

Historical flags of the New Hebrides

See also

 Coat of arms of Vanuatu

References

Sources
 

National flags
Flag
Flags introduced in 1980